The members of the 12th Manitoba Legislature were elected in the Manitoba general election held in March 1907. The legislature sat from January 2, 1908, to June 30, 1910.

The Conservatives led by Rodmond Roblin formed the government.

Charles Mickle of the Liberal Party served as Leader of the Opposition. After Mickle was named a judge in 1909, Tobias Norris became party leader and leader of the opposition.

James Johnson served as speaker for the assembly.

There were three sessions of the 12th Legislature:

Daniel Hunter McMillan was Lieutenant Governor of Manitoba.

Members of the Assembly 
The following members were elected to the assembly in 1907:

Notes:

By-elections 
By-elections were held to replace members for various reasons:

Notes:

References 

Terms of the Manitoba Legislature
1908 establishments in Manitoba
1910 disestablishments in Manitoba